Joshua Paschal (born December 17, 1999) is an American football defensive end for the Detroit Lions of the National Football League (NFL). He played college football at Kentucky and was selected by the Lions in the second round of the 2022 NFL Draft.

Early life and high school
Paschal was born in Washington, D.C. and grew up in Prince George's County, Maryland. He attended Our Lady of Good Counsel High School, where he played football and basketball. As a senior, Paschal had 64 tackles, nine tackles for loss, and 5.5 sacks. Paschal was rated a four-star recruited and committed to play college football at Kentucky Wildcats over offers from Maryland, Oklahoma, Notre Dame, Clemson, Ohio State, and USC.

College career
Paschal played in all 13 of Kentucky's games as a freshman and finished the season with 17 tackles, 4.5 tackles for loss, and 3.5 sacks. Before the start of preseason training camp he was diagnosed with malignant melanoma on his left foot. Paschal used a medical redshirt while undergoing treatment, but was able to return for the final three games of Kentucky's season. He recorded 34 tackles,  9.5 tackles for loss, 3.5 sacks, and two forced fumbles in his redshirt sophomore season. Paschal finished his redshirt junior season with 32 tackles, 6.5 tackles for loss, one sack, and one interception. Paschal was named first-team All-Southeastern Conference by the Associated Press as redshirt senior after recording 52 tackles and five sacks.

Professional career

Paschal was drafted by the Detroit Lions in the second round, 46th overall, in the 2022 NFL Draft. He was placed on the reserve/PUP list to start the season on August 23, 2022. He was activated on October 22.

Personal life
Paschal's older brother, TraVaughn, also played football at Kentucky.

References

External links
 Detroit Lions bio
Kentucky Wildcats bio

1999 births
Living people
Players of American football from Maryland
Sportspeople from the Washington metropolitan area
American football defensive ends
Kentucky Wildcats football players
People from Prince George's County, Maryland
Detroit Lions players